Myxostoma is a genus of land snails with a gill and an operculum, terrestrial gastropod mollusks in the subfamily Cyclophorinae of the family Cyclophoridae.

Species 
Species within the genus Myxostoma include:
 Myxostoma boucheti Thach, 2021
 Myxostoma lychnus (Morelet, 1862)
 Myxostoma messageri Bavay & Dautzenberg, 1904 
 Myxostoma paradoxum Dautzenberg & H. Fischer, 1908
 Myxostoma petiverianum (Wood, 1828)
Synonyms
 Myxostoma aubryanum Heude, 1885: synonym of Ptychopoma aubryanum (Heude, 1885) (original combination)
 Myxostoma aureum Heude, 1885: synonym of Pterocyclos aureus (Heude, 1885) (original combination)
 Myxostoma delavayanum Heude, 1888: synonym of Ptychopoma delavayanum (Heude, 1888) (original combination)
 Myxostoma expoliatum Heude, 1885: synonym of Ptychopoma expoliatum (Heude, 1885) (original combination)
 Myxostoma humile Heude, 1885: synonym of Ptychopoma humile (Heude, 1885) (original combination)
 Myxostoma laciniata Heude, 1885: synonym of Scabrina laciniata (Heude, 1885) (original combination)
 Myxostoma laciniatum Heude, 1885: synonym of Scabrina laciniata (Heude, 1885) (original combination)
 Myxostoma lienense (Gredler, 1882): synonym of Ptychopoma lienense (Gredler, 1882) (unaccepted combination)
 Myxostoma recognitum Heude, 1885: synonym of Ptychopoma chinense (Möllendorff, 1874) (junior synonym)
 Myxostoma setchuanense Heude, 1885: synonym of Ptychopoma setchuanense (Heude, 1885) (original combination)
 Myxostoma subalatum Heude, 1886: synonym of Ptychopoma subalatum (Heude, 1886) (original combination)
 Myxostoma tortile Heude, 1885: synonym of Ptychopoma tortile (Heude, 1885) (original combination)
 Myxostoma tubulare Heude, 1885: synonym of Ptychopoma tubulare (Heude, 1885) (original combination)
 Myxostoma vestitum Heude, 1885: synonym of Ptychopoma expoliatum vestitum (Heude, 1885) (original combination)

References

 Bank, R. A. (2017). Classification of the Recent terrestrial Gastropoda of the World. Last update: July 16th, 2017

External links

 Troschel, F. H. (1847). Ueber die Gattungen der Cyclostomiden. Zeitschrift für Malakozoologie. 4(3): 42-45.
 Kobelt W. (1902). Das Tierreich. Eine Zusammenstellung und Kennzeichnung der rezenten Tierformen. 16. Lieferung. Mollusca. Cyclophoridae. Das Tierreich. XXXIX + 662 pp., 1 map. (July). Berlin (R. Friedländer)

Cyclophoridae